κ Lyrae, Latinized as Kappa Lyrae, is a solitary star in the northern constellation of Lyra, near the constellation border with Hercules. It is visible to the naked eye as a faint, orange-hued point of light with an apparent visual magnitude of 4.33. This object is located approximately 252 light years from the Sun based on parallax, but is moving closer with a radial velocity of −24 km/s.

This is an aging giant star with a stellar classification of K2-IIIabCN0.5, with the suffix notation indicating a mild underabundance of cyanogen. Having exhausted the supply of hydrogen at its core, the star has cooled and expanded. It now has 18 times the Sun's girth and is radiating 127 times the luminosity of the Sun at an effective temperature of 4,638 K. κ Lyrae is a red clump giant, which means it is on the horizontal branch and is generating energy through core helium fusion. It is a suspected small amplitude variable star.

References

K-type giants
Horizontal-branch stars

Lyra (constellation)
Lyrae, Kappa
Durchmusterung objects
Lyrae, 01
168775
089826
6872